Viorica Dumbrăveanu (born 23 December 1976) is a Moldovan politician. She served as Minister of Health, Labour and Social Protection from 14 November 2019 to 31 December 2020 in the cabinet of Prime Minister Ion Chicu.

References 

Living people
1976 births
Place of birth missing (living people)
21st-century Moldovan politicians
Government ministers of Moldova
Women government ministers of Moldova
21st-century Moldovan women politicians